Scolionema is a genus of hydrozoans belonging to the family Olindiidae.

Species:

Scolionema sanshin 
Scolionema suvaense

References

Olindiidae
Hydrozoan genera